Measuring the Universe is a performance art work by Slovak artist Roman Ondak first installed in the Pinakothek der Moderne in Munich in 2007. The exhibition stars as a blank white wall and begins to fill when museum guards mark visitors' height along with their name and the current date. It is in the collection of Tate Modern in London, Pinakother der Moderne in Munich and MoMa in New York.

Materials
The only items required for the installation were a white room and a few black markers. What began as  a clean white space has been filled with letters and lines and numbers as people pass through the gallery. Each tiny line represents a different person. The thousands and thousands of lines show just how many people pass through the museum each day, and how many people have been affected by this installation.

References

Sources 
MoMA
artbabble.org, Video Interview with Roman Ondak
CCA Wattis Institute for Contemporary Arts
https://publicdelivery.org/roman-ondak-measuring-the-universe/
https://www.moma.org/learn/moma_learning/roman-ondak-measuring-the-universe-2007

Installation art works
Performances